Diana Clapham (born 8 June 1957) is a British equestrian. She was born in Kuala Lumpur, Malaysia. She won a silver medal in team eventing at the 1984 Summer Olympics in Los Angeles.

References

External links

1957 births
Living people
Sportspeople from Kuala Lumpur
British event riders
Olympic equestrians of Great Britain
British female equestrians
Olympic silver medallists for Great Britain
Equestrians at the 1984 Summer Olympics
Olympic medalists in equestrian
Medalists at the 1984 Summer Olympics
20th-century British women